Resolven railway station served the village of Resolven, Neath Port Talbot, Wales, from 1851 to 1964 on the Vale of Neath Railway.

History 
Construction of the Vale of Neath line, including the station at Resolven, was announced in 1845. The station was opened on 24 September 1851 by the Vale of Neath Railway. The station served as a polling station in the 1885 general election. In 1905 a GWR guard was killed when he fell between the platform and a moving goods train at the station. The death was ruled to be accidental by the local coroner. It closed on 15 June 1964.

References 

Disused railway stations in Neath Port Talbot
Beeching closures in Wales
Railway stations in Great Britain opened in 1851
Railway stations in Great Britain closed in 1964
1851 establishments in Wales
1964 disestablishments in Wales